Sergio González Poirrier (born 20 April 1992) is a Spanish professional footballer who plays for CD Leganés. Mainly a central defender, he can also play as a defensive midfielder.

Club career
Born in Madrid, González joined Real Madrid's La Fábrica in 2008, from Getafe CF. In 2011, after finishing his formation, he joined Regional Preferente side Las Rozas CF, and made his debut during the season.

González moved to AD Villaviciosa de Odón in Tercera División in July 2012, being a regular starter during the campaign as his side suffered relegation. In July of the following year, he agreed to a contract with AD Alcorcón, being assigned to the reserves in the same division.

In 2015, González signed for UD San Sebastián de los Reyes, still in the fourth tier; he achieved promotion to Segunda División B in his first season, being a first-choice option, and captained the side in his second. On 15 July 2017, he agreed to a one-year contract with Recreativo de Huelva in division three.

On 23 July 2018, free agent González joined fellow third tier club CD Mirandés on a one-year deal. The following 5 July, after achieving promotion to Segunda División, he renewed his contract for a further year.

On 17 August 2019, aged 27, González made his professional debut by starting in a 2–2 away draw against Rayo Vallecano. He scored his first goal in the second division on 24 November, netting his team's second in a 2–1 away defeat of Albacete Balompié.

On 10 August 2020, González agreed to a three-year contract with CD Leganés, freshly relegated to the second tier.

References

External links
 
 
 

1992 births
Living people
Footballers from Madrid
Spanish footballers
Association football defenders
Segunda División players
Segunda División B players
Tercera División players
Divisiones Regionales de Fútbol players
Las Rozas CF players
AD Alcorcón B players
UD San Sebastián de los Reyes players
Recreativo de Huelva players
CD Mirandés footballers
CD Leganés players